The 2021 European Truck Racing Championship was a motor-racing championship using highly tuned tractor units. It was the 37th year of the championship. A seven round calendar was announced on November 17, 2020, which was slated to begin May 22, 2021 at the Misano World Circuit in Italy and conclude with October 3 at the Circuito del Jarama in Spain. However, due to continued restrictions resulting from the COVID-19 pandemic, the round at Misano was postponed to the end of the season, moving the round at the Hungaroring in Hungary on June 12 as the first race of the season.

For the 2021 season, began a program promoting energy sustainability by having all competitors use biodiesel, making it the first FIA sanctioned series to utilize 100% sustainable fuel sources. TotalEnergies became the exclusive fuel provider for the series and provided competitors with Hydrotreated vegetable oil as fuel. 

Norbert Kiss won his third championship in the series, while Shane Brereton took his second victory in the Goodyear Cup.

Calendar

A 7 round championship was announced on November 17, 2020. The Slovakia Ring fell off the schedule after having appeared in several previous seasons. The original schedule was slated to begin at the Misano World Circuit, but was postponed, leaving the Hungaroring as the opening round.

The round at the Nürburgring was expanded to hold 6 races instead of the standard 4 race format, with 3 races held each day between July 17 and 18. However, the event was cancelled days before it was scheduled due to major infrastructure damage in the surrounding area caused by severe flooding.

Teams and drivers
The following table lists all teams and drivers who competed during the 2021 season.

Results and Standings

Season Summary

Drivers standings
At each race, points are awarded to the top ten classified finishers using the following structure:

 Race 2 cancelled due to barrier damage caused by an accident on lap 1.

External links

References

2021 European Truck Racing Championship
2021 in motorsport
Truck Racing